Smara Airport  is an airport in Smara (also known as Semara), a city in Western Sahara (administered by Morocco).

Destinations
There are currently no scheduled commercial flights to and from Smara Airport.

References

External links
 

Airports in Western Sahara